Gary Robson is the name of:

Gary Robson (darts player) (born 1967), English darts player
Gary Robson (footballer) (born 1965), English footballer
Gary D. Robson (born 1958), American author